Boneh Deraz (also Romanized as Boneh Derāz; also known as Bonderāz) is a village in Saroleh Rural District, Meydavud District, Bagh-e Malek County, Khuzestan Province, Iran. At the 2006 census, its population was 267, in 56 families.

References 

Populated places in Bagh-e Malek County